Hongshuia banmo is a species of cyprinid fish in the genus Hongshuia endemic to China.

References 

Hongshuia
Fish described in 2008